Heinz Rögner (16 January 1929 – 10 December 2001) was a German conductor. He was born in Leipzig.

Rögner was a student of Hugo Steurer (piano), Egon Bölsche (conducting) and Otto Gutschlicht (viola).  From 1947 to 1951, he was a repetiteur and kapellmeister at the conductor at the Deutsches Nationaltheater and Staatskapelle Weimar.  In 1954, he became a lecturer in conducting and opera at the Hochschule für Musik und Theater Felix Mendelssohn Bartholdy in Leipzig.  He was also a professor at the Hochschule für Musik Hanns Eisler.

From 1958 to 1962, Rögner was chief conductor of the Leipzig Radio Orchestra.  From 1973 to 1993, he was chief conductor of the Berlin Radio Symphony Orchestra.  In 1984, he became chief conductor of the Yomiuri Nippon Symphony Orchestra, and in 1990 took the title of permanent guest conductor.

References

External links
 
 Klassik.com German language CD review, 5 November 2003

German male conductors (music)
1929 births
2001 deaths
Musicians from Leipzig
20th-century German conductors (music)
20th-century German male musicians
Academic staff of the Hochschule für Musik Hanns Eisler Berlin